ripit is a Linux command-line CD ripper originally developed by Simon Quinn. It is a Perl script which can create flac, ogg, mp3, m4a (aac), als (mp4), mpc, wv or other files from an audio CD. Encoding is done with all CDDB information. It has many options but can be used successfully without them, making the program easier to use than the underlying or other command-line programs.

Ripit requires perl, a ripping program such as cdparanoia, an encoder such as vorbis-tools for encoding the wav files to a compressed format, a module for CDDB retrieval, and a few libraries. Many popular Linux distributions include ripit. Besides the info on the official website in English and German, third-party reviews  and instructions  are available.

See also
 CD ripper article about other software with similar features.

References

Free software
CD ripping software